USS Kenosha may refer to:

, was a wooden-hulled screw sloop-of-war laid down in 1867 and renamed Plymouth 15 May 1869
, was an  acquired by the US Navy on 1 August 1945 and decommissioned 16 April 1946

United States Navy ship names